The 106th Aviation Regiment is an aviation regiment of the United States Army.

Structure

 1st Battalion (Assault Helicopter) (UH-60V) (WI ARNG)
 Headquarters and Headquarters Company (IL ARNG)
 Company A at Decatur (IL ARNG)
 Company B at Kankakee (IL ARNG)
Company C at Winder (GA ARNG)
 Company D
 Detachment ? at Decatur (IL ARNG)
 Company E 
 Detachment ? at Peoria (IL ARNG)

References

106